Olympia High School is an American public high school which was opened on August 13, 2001 in unincorporated Orange County, Florida, United States, near Orlando.

Olympia serves the following in the MetroWest area: Gotha, Windermere, and sections of Lake Butler.

Notable alumni
 Sherwood Brown, professional basketball player, member of Florida Gulf Coast team that reached the 2013 Sweet Sixteen
 Deondre Francois, Fan Controlled Football (FCF) quarterback
 Nick Gordon, Minnesota Twins shortstop
 Chris Johnson, former NFL Running Back 
 Rashad Lawrence, former NFL and CFL Wide Receiver
 Leah Lewis, actress
 Michael Lockley, former NFL and CFL Linebacker
 Brad Miller, Major League Baseball player Texas Rangers
 Marc-Eddy Norelia, professional basketball player for European Basketball League
 Trevor Siemian, NFL quarterback
 Jesse Winker, Major League Baseball player Milwaukee Brewers

References

External links

High schools in Orange County, Florida
Public high schools in Florida
Orange County Public Schools
2001 establishments in Florida
Educational institutions established in 2001